The Velveteins is an indie rock band from Edmonton, Alberta, Canada. The group consists of core songwriting members Spencer Morphy (guitar, singer) and Addison Hiller (percussion, singer).

History 
Originating as a solo project by Morphy, The Velveteins group was formed in 2014 after Morphy's extended trip in Australia during which he "fell in love with the psychedelic music and lush beaches of Australia". The band's self-produced first effort, Fresh Claws EP, was released in 2014 and marked the first collaborative work by Morphy and Hiller. A second release, A Hot Second with the Velveteins, was produced and recorded by Lincoln Parish of Cage The Elephant in his home studio in Nashville, Tennessee. This release received critical acclaim locally and internationally. The band has played CMW in Toronto and has opened for high-profile indie acts such as Milo Greene, USS, and July Talk. In 2015, the Velveteins' released A Hot Second with The Velveteins was nominated for an Edmonton Music Award. In 2017, the band released the album Slow Wave and toured throughout Canada and the United States.

Members 
 Spencer Morphy – vocals, guitar
 Addison Hiller – vocals, percussion
 Dean Kheroufi – bass
 Daniel (Danger) Sedmak – guitar/keys

Discography

Albums 

 Slow Wave (2017)

EPs 

 A Hot Second with the Velveteins (2015)

Singles 

 Don't Yah Feel Better (2016)
 Midnight Surf (2017)
 Love in a Modern Age/Last Night (2019)
 Cosmic Saturation (2021)
 Make It Through (2021)

References

External links 
 

Musical groups from Edmonton
Musical groups established in 2014
Canadian indie rock groups
Fierce Panda Records artists
2014 establishments in Alberta